Saracini is a surname. Notable people with the surname include:

Claudio Saracini (1586–1630), Italian composer, lutenist and singer
Valon Saracini (born 1971), Macedonian politician
Victor Saracini, a pilot aboard United Airlines Flight 175